P.J.J.M. (Paul) Peters (Roosteren, 1942) is a Dutch politician of the Catholic People's Party and later the Christian Democratic Appeal.

He was born as the son of the head teacher and later politician Jan Mathijs Peters. He himself was chief commissioner at the municipal secretariat in Ede and also a municipal councilor in Heteren before he became mayor of the Limburg municipality of Wijlre in November 1975, which ceased to exist on 1 January 1982 and was divided among the new municipalities of Margraten and Gulpen. In August 1981 Peters was appointed mayor of the municipality of Belfeld and in June 1992 he was appointed mayor of Didam. On 1 January 2005, the municipalities of Didam and Bergh merged to form the new municipality Montferland, of which Peters was acting mayor until Ina Leppink-Schuitema succeeded him there in September 2005. From June 2006 he was acting mayor of Lingewaard for almost a year.

In August 2010, he was one of the concerned CDA members who, by signing a manifesto, publicly indicated that they were against the CDA's participation in a government coalition with the support of the PVV (later the First Rutte cabinet).

References

1942 births
Living people
Catholic People's Party politicians
Christian Democratic Appeal politicians
People from Echt-Susteren